JIJ may refer to:

 Jerusalem Institute of Justice, a Human rights nonprofit organization operating in Israel
 Jijiga Airport, an airport in the Somali Region of Ethiopia